Ambohimisafy is a rural municipality in Madagascar. It belongs to the district of Ikongo, which is a part of Fitovinany. The population of this municipality is 3,281 inhabitants in 2018.

Only primary schooling is available. The majority 98% of the population of the commune are farmers.  The most important crops are coffee and bananas, while other important agricultural products are cassava and rice. Services provide employment for 2% of the population.

It is situated at the Faraony River.

References

Populated places in Fitovinany